Macarena is a 1992 Venezuelan telenovela written by Ligia Lezama and broadcast on Venevisión. Kiara and Luis José Santander starred as the main protagonists, with Elluz Peraza and Miguel Alcantara starred as the antagonists.

Kiara who starred in the main role, sang the theme song for the telenovela

References

External links
Macarena at the Internet Movie Database

1992 telenovelas
Venevisión telenovelas
Venezuelan telenovelas
1992 Venezuelan television series debuts
1993 Venezuelan television series endings
Spanish-language telenovelas
Television shows set in Venezuela